Spencer Johnson may refer to:
Spencer Johnson (American football) (born 1981), American football defensive tackle
Spencer Johnson (cricketer) (born 1995), Australian cricketer
Spencer Johnson (soccer) (born 1991), American soccer midfielder 
Spencer Johnson (writer) (1938–2017), American author, speaker, and management consultant